Borislav Ćurčić (January 27, 1932 – April 15, 2015) was a Serbian basketball player and coach. He represented the Yugoslavia national basketball team internationally.

Early life 
Born in the village of Podum near Otočac (nowadays in Croatia), in addition to basketball, Ćurčić also pursued skiing.

Playing career 
Ćurčić played for two Belgrade teams Crvena zvezda and Partizan in the Yugoslav First League, as well as for Pallacanestro Cantù in Italy for two seasons. During the time with Crvena zvezda he won 6 Yugoslav Championships.

In July 1950, he was a member of the Zvezda squad that won an international cup tournament in Milan, Italy.

National team career 
Ćurčić was a member of the Yugoslavia national basketball team that participated at the 1953 European Championship in Moscow, the Soviet Union. Over ten tournament games, he averaged 11.0 points per game while shooting 80.4 percent from the field. He was the team-leading scorer and had three games with 20 and more points scored. Ćurčić was a member of the national team at the 1954 FIBA World Championship in Rio de Janeiro, Brazil. Over five tournament games, he averaged 11.4 points per game while shooting 77.1 percent from the field. Ćurčić was a member of the national team at the 1955 European Championship in Budapest, Hungary. Over eleven tournament games, he averaged 11.2 points per game while shooting 72.8 percent from the field. He was the team-leading scorer and had two games with 20 and more points scored. On June 19, 1955, he scored a career-high 26 points in a 66–69 loss to Italy.

Coaching career 
Ćurčić coached Partizan Belgrade for three seasons in the Yugoslav First League.

Career achievements and awards

Player 
 Yugoslav League champion: 6 (with Crvena zvezda: 1950, 1951, 1952, 1953, 1954, 1955).

See also 
 List of KK Partizan head coaches
 Milan Bjegojević
 List of Yugoslav First Federal Basketball League annual scoring leaders

References

1932 births
2015 deaths
Serbs of Croatia
KK Crvena zvezda players
KK Partizan players
KK Partizan coaches
Croatian expatriate basketball people in Serbia
Pallacanestro Cantù players
Serbian expatriate basketball people in Italy
Serbian men's basketball players
Serbian men's basketball coaches
Yugoslav men's basketball players
Yugoslav basketball coaches
1954 FIBA World Championship players